The Art of Rolling is the debut album by the Danish blues rock group The Blue Van. Released in April 2005 under TVT Records.

Track listing 

Word from the Bird  (2:21)
Product of DK  (2:41)
I Remember the Days  (2:57)
I Want You  (2:10)
Remains of Sir Maison  (2:27)
Baby, I've Got Time  (3:30)
Bluverture  (2:11)
Revelation of Love (2:51)
Mob Rule  (2:56)
What the Young People Want  (3:23)
Coeur de Lion  (3:47)
New Slough  (8:15)
Have Love Will Travel (Bonus track, Japanese Version)
Papa's Got a Brand New Bag (Bonus track, Japanese Version)

References

2005 debut albums
The Blue Van albums